Acrodipsas arcana, the black-veined ant-blue or arcana ant-blue, is a butterfly of the family Lycaenidae. It is found inland on hills in southern Queensland and northern New South Wales in Australia.

Adults have a wingspan of about 20 mm. They are brown on top, with iridescent blue patches. The underside is brown, with dark white-edged arcs. Each hindwing has a pair of black spots on both the over- and underside.

External links
Australian Caterpillars

Acrodipsas
Butterflies of Australia
Butterflies described in 1978